The Return of Jezebel James is an American sitcom television series, starring Parker Posey as a successful children's book editor who, unable to have children herself, asks her estranged younger sister (Lauren Ambrose) to carry her baby.  The series was created by Amy Sherman-Palladino of Gilmore Girls fame, who also directed the pilot, and executive produced the show with her husband, Daniel Palladino. The show was produced by Regency Television and Dorothy Parker Drank Here Productions.

The show premiered on the Fox television network on March 14, 2008, as a mid-season replacement.  After airing only three episodes, it was cancelled due to what Fox called unacceptably low ratings.

The remaining four unaired episodes were released on Apple iTunes on May 6, 2008.

Cast

Principal characters
Parker Posey - Sarah Tompkins
Lauren Ambrose - Coco Tompkins
Michael Arden - Buddy
Scott Cohen - Marcus Sonti
Ron McLarty - Ronald Tompkins
Haysha Deitsch - Al

Recurring characters
Dana Ivey - Molly
Dianne Wiest - Talia Tompkins
Savanah Stehlin - Zoe
Jack Carpenter as Dash
Jasika Nicole - Dora
Renée Elise Goldsberry - Paget

Episodes

U.S. Nielsen Ratings

Production
The series came into fruition when Fox gave it a put pilot commitment in July 2006. It entered production and was named The Return of Jezebel James in December 2006 before casting began in January 2007 when Scott Cohen was the first to be cast in the regular role of Marcus Sonti. In February 2007, Parker Posey was cast in the lead role. Casting continued throughout March 2007 with Emmy Award-nominee Lauren Ambrose, Michael Arden, Ron McLarty and Tony Award-nominee Dana Ivey all landing roles in the series.

The series was greenlit and given a 13-episode order on May 11, 2007, but in October 2007, it was cut to seven episodes in anticipation of the pending writers strike.

The show was officially canceled after the third episode aired.

References

External links
 
Interview with Amy Sherman-Palladino in Entertainment Weekly

2000s American sitcoms
2008 American television series debuts
2008 American television series endings
Fox Broadcasting Company original programming
Television series about sisters
Television series by 20th Century Fox Television
Television shows set in New York City
Television series created by Amy Sherman-Palladino